CT Values are an important part of calculating disinfectant dosage for the chlorination of drinking water. A CT value is the product of the concentration of a disinfectant (e.g. free chlorine) and the contact time with the water being disinfected. It is typically expressed in units of mg-min/L.

The goal of disinfection is the inactivation of microorganisms. This depends on: the microorganism, the disinfectant being used, the concentration of the disinfectant, the contact time, and the temperature and pH of the water.

Kinetics
The disinfection kinetics are conventionally calculated via the Chick-Watson model, named for the work of Harriette Chick and H. E. Watson. This model is expressed by the following equation:

 

Where:
   is the survival ratio for the microorganisms being killed
   is the Chick-Watson coefficient of specific lethality
  is the concentration of the disinfectant (typically in mg/L)
  is the coefficient of dilution, frequently assumed to be 1
  is the contact time (typically in minutes or seconds)

The survival ratio is commonly expressed as an inactivation ratio (in %) or as the number of reductions in the order of magnitude of the microorganism concentration. For example, a situation where N0=107 CFU/L and N=104 CFU/L would be reported as a 99.9% inactivation or "3-log10" removal.

In water treatment practice, tables of the product C×t are used to calculate disinfection dosages. The calculated CT value is the product of the disinfectant residual (in mg/L) and the detention time (in minutes), through the section at peak hourly flow. These tables express the required CT values to achieve a desired removal of microorganisms of interest in drinking water (e.g. Giardia lamblia cysts) for a given disinfectant under constant temperature and pH conditions. A portion of such a table is reproduced below.

Example CT Table
CT Values for the Inactivation of Giardia Cysts by Free Chlorine at 5 °C and pH ≈ 7.0:

Full tables are much larger than this example and should be obtained from the regulatory agency for a particular jurisdiction.

See also
 Chlorination
 Disinfectant

References

External links
 

Water treatment
Chlorine